Sciodrepoides watsoni is a species of beetle in the Leiodidae family that can be found everywhere in Europe except for various European islands, Andorra, Estonia, Liechtenstein, Luxembourg, Moldova, Monaco, North Macedonia, Portugal, San Marino, and Vatican City.

References

External links
Sciodrepoides watsoni on Flickr
Black and white photos of the species on Micro Photo
Sciodrepoides watsoni on Meloidae.com

watsoni
Beetles described in 1815
Beetles of Europe